Samos (before 1958: Βαθυ - Vathy) is a port town on the island of Samos in Greece. It is the capital of the regional unit of Samos and of the municipality of East Samos. It is also known by its old name of Vathy (Βαθύ), though this now usually refers to the old hillside suburb of Ano Vathy. In 2011, Samos Town had a population of 6,251 while the combined population with Ano Vathy is 8,079.

History
The town of Samos was built in the middle of 18th century as the port of Vathy. At first there were only depots for the necessities of the trade. Samos town was initially named Kato Vathy (meaning lower Vathy) or Limenas Vatheos (port of Vathy). The current name (Samos Town) was given in 1958 when it combined with Ano Vathy (upper Vathy) on the hillside above the port. 

During 19th century it became the administration centre of the island.  At that time, its population increased. After the union of Samos with Greece, Samos town remained the administrative centre of the island, as well as becoming the capital of the modern municipality of Samos.

Historical population

Description
Samos town spreads from the coast at the port of Vathy up to the hillside neighbourhood of Ano Vathy. Its houses are built in amphitheatrical formation, around the bay. In front of the settlement is the port with a wharf of more than 150 meters length.  Notable buildings in Samos are the old churches of Agios Nikolaos and Agios Spiridon, the town hall, the archeological museum and two statues (the statue of Themistocles Sofoulis on the coastal road and the big lion statue on the central square).

References

Populated places in Samos
Populated places in the ancient Aegean islands